Give Me Your Future is the fifth studio album (sixth counting the unreleased Love You More than Football) by Space, and their first full-length release following the departure of organist Ryan Clarke in 2014. The album was crowdfunded through the site PledgeMusic. Early copies of the album were given away at Space's concert at the Arts Club, Liverpool on 22 December 2017, released through their manager Mark Cowley's label Mulü, and was made available to stream on 4 December 2020.

Give Me Your Future is considered a departure from the ska and psychobilly stylings of the band's previous album Attack of the Mutant 50ft Kebab, with minimalist lyrics inspired by retrofuturism and the 1927 film Metropolis. It is sonically influenced by new wave/synth pop artists such as Devo and Fad Gadget, along with nods to contemporary electronic movements such as synthwave and glitch pop. Frontman and lead songwriter Tommy Scott noted that the group set out to make a record that was "classier" than their previous output.

Recording sessions for Give Me Your Future took place in early 2016 with producer Steve Levine, with additional sessions in June that year. The band left much of their usual kit behind and worked almost exclusively with analog synthesizers and other vintage electronic instruments that belonged in Levine's studio. The band also used traditional acoustic instruments such as glockenspiel and accordion during the recording.

Track listing 
All songs written by Tommy Scott, Franny Griffiths, Phil Hartley, Allan Jones and Steve Levine.

Personnel

Space
Tommy Scott – lead vocals, guitars
Franny Griffiths – keyboards, synthesizers, sonic manipulations, backing vocals, artwork
Phil Hartley – bass, accordion ("Hold No Fear"), backing vocals
Allan Jones – drums, electronic percussion, guitar, backing vocals

Additional personnel 
Paul Hemmings - guitar
Steve Levine - additional backing vocals
Horse - sleeve design

References 

2017 albums
Space (English band) albums
Albums produced by Steve Levine
Crowdfunded albums